Pouteria is a genus of flowering trees in the gutta-percha family, Sapotaceae. The genus is widespread throughout the tropical regions of the world. It includes the canistel (P. campechiana), the mamey sapote (P. sapota), and the lucuma (P. lucuma). Commonly, this genus is known as pouteria trees, or in some cases, eggfruits.

Pouteria is related to Manilkara, another genus that produces hard and heavy woods (e.g. balatá, M. bidentata) used commonly for tropical construction, as well as edible fruit (such as sapodilla, M. zapota).

Uses 

Many species, such as Pouteria maclayana, have edible fruits and are important foods, seasonally. Some are being commercially collected and sold on local markets or packed in cans.

Pouteria species yield hard, heavy, resilient woods used as firewood and timber, but particularly in outdoor and naval construction, such as dock pilings, deckings, etc. Some species, such as abiu (P. caimito), are considered to be shipworm resistant, but this depends on the silica content, which may vary from 0.0-0.9%. The weight by volume (at 12% moisture content) of Pouteria wood can be in excess of 1140 kg/m3 (71 lb/ft3; thus, the wood sinks in water. The wood of Pouteria species is prone to considerable movement and warping when it dries out, but in its main use, naval construction, this is not a problem, since the wood never gets really dry.

The vessel elements are relatively small and usually di- to quadriseriate; the medullary rays are fine and close together. Pouteria woods are capable of attaining an excellent polish using fine-grained sandpaper and possibly some wax. They can sometimes show an attractive figure of dark stripes against a sandy to mid-brown background colour. However, the wood is hardly used for furniture because it is so dense that items made from it would be difficult to transport. Moreover, it is nearly impossible to work using hand tools. Even using power tools, working these woods presents some problems, as well, but given some patience and practical knowledge, these can easily be solved.

For the silica to be effective against shipworms, it needs to dry to some degree  to harden. When the wood is continually waterlogged, this process may take place very slowly or not at all, leaving the wood vulnerable.

Pouteria foliage is used as food by some Lepidoptera caterpillars, including those of the dalcerid moth Dalcera abrasa, which has been recorded on P. ramiflora. The fruits are important food for various animals, such as the rock-haunting ringtail possum (Petropseudes dahli).

Due to habitat loss and in some cases overexploitation, many species of Pouteria are threatened. At least 10 are close to extinction, and one – the Rio de Janeiro pouteria (P. stenophylla), which grew near Rio de Janeiro in Brazil, is now extinct.

Systematics and taxonomy 

Pouteria is a "wastebasket taxon", and its size is continually being expanded or decreased. The segregated Labatia, described by Olof Swartz in 1788 and named after the French botanist Jean-Baptiste Labat, was maintained as a distinct entity until the 1930s, when it was finally synonymized with Pouteria for good. Most segregated genera that were eventually merged with Pouteria again were established by Henri Ernest Baillon and Jean Baptiste Louis Pierre.

Selected species 

 Pouteria adolfi-friedericii
 Pouteria altissima
 Pouteria amapaensis
 Pouteria amygdalina
 Pouteria andarahiensis
 Pouteria anteridata
 Pouteria arcuata
 Pouteria areolatifolia
 Pouteria arguacoensium
 Pouteria aristata
 Pouteria arnhemica (F.Muell. ex Benth.) Baehni
 Pouteria atabapoensis
 Pouteria austin-smithii
 Pouteria australis (R.Br.) Baehni
 Pouteria bapeba
 Pouteria beaurepairei
 Pouteria belizensis
 Pouteria benai
 Pouteria bonneriana
 Pouteria bracteata
 Pouteria brevensis
 Pouteria brevipedicellata
 Pouteria brevipetiolata
 Pouteria briocheoides
 Pouteria brownlessiana (F.Muell.) Baehni
 Pouteria buenaventurensis
 Pouteria bullata
 Pouteria butyrocarpa
 Pouteria caimito – abiu
 Pouteria calistophylla
 Pouteria campechiana – canistel, yellow sapote
 Pouteria canaimaensis
 Pouteria capacifolia
 Pouteria cayennensis
 Pouteria chartacea (F.Muell. ex Benth.) Baehni
 Pouteria chiricana
 Pouteria chocoensis
 Pouteria cicatricata
 Pouteria cinnamomea
 Pouteria coelomatica
 Pouteria collina
 Pouteria congestifolia
 Pouteria contermina
 Pouteria costata – tawāpou, bastard ironwood
 Pouteria crassiflora
 Pouteria cubensis
 Pouteria cuspidata (A.DC.) Baehni
 Pouteria danikeri
 Pouteria decorticans
 Pouteria decussata
 Pouteria durlandii
 Pouteria eerwah (F.M.Bailey) Baehni – shiny-leaved condoo, black plum, wild apple
 Pouteria espinae
 Pouteria euryphylla
 Pouteria euphlebia (F.Muell.) Baehni
 Pouteria exstaminodia
 Pouteria filiformis
 Pouteria fossicola
 Pouteria foveolata
 Pouteria franciscana
 Pouteria fulva
 Pouteria furcata
 Pouteria gabrielensis
 Pouteria gallifructa
 Pouteria gigantea
 Pouteria glauca
 Pouteria glomerata
 subsp. stylosa
 Pouteria gracilis
 Pouteria grandiflora
 Pouteria guianensis Aubl.
 Pouteria hotteana
 Pouteria howeana (F.Muell.) Baehni
 Pouteria izabalensis
 Pouteria jariensis
 Pouteria juruana
 Pouteria kaalaensis
 Pouteria kaieteurensis
 Pouteria krukovii
 Pouteria latianthera
 Pouteria leptopedicellata
 Pouteria longifolia
 Pouteria lucens
 Pouteria lucuma – lúcuma, lucumo
 Pouteria macahensis
 Pouteria maclayana (F.Muell.) Baehni
 Pouteria macrocarpa
 Pouteria macrophylla
 Pouteria maguirei
 Pouteria malaccensis (C.B.Clarke) Baehni
 Pouteria melanopoda
 Pouteria micrantha
 Pouteria microstrigosa
 Pouteria minima
 Pouteria moaensis
 Pouteria multiflora
 Pouteria myrsinoides (F.Muell.) Jessup
 Pouteria myrsinodendron (F.Muell.) Jessup
 Pouteria nemorosa
 Pouteria nudipetala
 Pouteria obovata (R.Br.) Baehni
 Pouteria oppositifolia
 Pouteria orinocoensis
 Pouteria oxypetala
 Pouteria pachycalyx
 Pouteria pachyphylla
 Pouteria pallens
 Pouteria pallida
 Pouteria peduncularis
 Pouteria penicillata
 Pouteria peruviensis
 Pouteria petiolata
 Pouteria pimichinensis
 Pouteria pisquiensis
 Pouteria platyphylla
 Pouteria pohlmaniana (F.Muell.) Baehni
 Pouteria polysepala
 Pouteria psammophila
 Pouteria pseudoracemosa
 Pouteria puberula
 Pouteria pubescens
 Pouteria putamen-ovi
 Pouteria retinervis
 Pouteria rhynchocarpa
 Pouteria ramiflora (Mart.) Radlk.
 Pouteria reticulata
 Pouteria retinervis
 Pouteria richardii (F.Muell.) Baehni
 Pouteria rigidopsis
 Pouteria rostrata
 Pouteria rufotomentosa
 Pouteria sagotiana
 Pouteria sandwicensis (A.Gray) Baehni & O.Deg. – Ālaa (Hawaii)
 Pouteria sapota – mamey sapote
 Pouteria sclerocarpa
 Pouteria scrobiculata
 Pouteria semecarpifolia
 Pouteria sessilis
 Pouteria silvestris
 Pouteria sipapoensis
 Pouteria splendens
 Pouteria squamosa
 Pouteria stenophylla (extinct)
 Pouteria subsessilifolia
 Pouteria tarapotensis
 Pouteria tarumanensis
 Pouteria tenuisepala
 Pouteria torta (Mart.) Radlk. – Abiurana
 subsp. tuberculata – Red Abiorana
 Pouteria trilocularis
 Pouteria triplarifolia
 Pouteria venosa
 subsp. amazonica
 Pouteria vernicosa
 Pouteria virescens – asipoko
 Pouteria viridis (Pittier) Cronquist
 Pouteria williamii
 Pouteria xerocarpa (F.Muell. ex Benth.) Baehni
 Pouteria xylocarpa

Formerly placed here 

 Englerophytum magalismontanum (as P. magalismontana)
 Synsepalum dulcificum (Miracle Fruit, as P. dulcifica)

Synonyms 

Due to the uncertainty regarding its actual content, the number of synonyms of Pouteria is massive – at least when the genus is defined in the expanded sense:

 Achradelpha O.F.Cook
 Albertisiella Pierre ex Aubrév.
 Aningeria Aubrév. & Pellegr.
 Barylucuma Ducke
 Beauvisagea Pierre
 Beccarimnia Pierre ex Koord.
 Blabea Baehni
 Blabeia Baehni
 Bureavella Pierre
 Calocarpum Pierre
 Calospermum Pierre
 Caramuri Aubrév. & Pellegr.
 Chaetocarpus Schreb. (non Thwaites: preoccupied)
 Daphniluma Baill.
 Discoluma Baill.
 Dithecoluma Baill.
 Eglerodendron Aubrév. & Pellegr.
 Englerella Pierre
 Eremoluma Baill.
 Fontbrunea Pierre
 Franchetella Pierre
 Gayella Pierre
 Gomphiluma Baill.
 Guapeba Gomes
 Hormogyne A.DC.
 Ichthyophora Baehni
 Iteiluma Baill.
 Krausella H.J.Lam
 Krugella Pierre
 Labatia Sw.
 Leioluma Baill.
 Lucuma Molina
 Maesoluma Baill.
 Malacantha Pierre
 Microluma Baill.
 Myrsiniluma Baill.
 Myrtiluma Baill.
 Nemaluma Baill.
 Neolabatia Aubrév.
 Neoxythece Aubrév. & Pellegr.
 Ochroluma Baill.
 Oxythece Miq.
 Paralabatia Pierre
 Peteniodendron Lundell
 Peuceluma Baill.
 Piresodendron Aubrév. ex Le Thomas
 Pleioluma Baill.
 Podoluma Baill.
 Poissonella Pierre
 "Prozetia" Neck. (nom. inval.)
 Pseudocladia Pierre
 Pseudolabatia Aubrév. & Pellegr.
 Pseudoxythece Aubrév.
 Pyriluma (Baill.) Aubrév.
 Radlkoferella Pierre
 Richardella Pierre
 Sandwithiodoxa Aubrév. & Pellegr.
 Siderocarpus  ierre
 Syzygiopsis Ducke
 Urbanella Pierre
 Woikoia Baehni
 Wokoia Baehni

In addition, the following genera are sometimes included in Pouteria too:

 "Beccariella" Pierre (non Cesati: preoccupied)
 Boerlagella Cogn.
 Planchonella Pierre
 Sersalisia R.Br.
 Van-royena Aubrév.

Footnotes

References 

  (1996): Germplasm Resources Information Network – Pouteria. Version of 2009-Mar-31. Retrieved 2009-Nov-15.

 
Sapotaceae genera